Cédric Kanté (born 6 July 1979) is a Malian former professional footballer who played as a defender. Born in France, he represented the Mali national team internationally winning 41 caps and scoring once.

Club career

Early career
Kanté progressed through the youth ranks at local club RC Strasbourg before starting his professional career there. He signed his first professional contract with them in 1999, at the age of 19. He spent two seasons with them, in his first stint, making 7 appearances and picking up a Coupe de France winners medal in 2001. He moved on to find first-team football playing for FC Istres, in Ligue 2. In one season at Istres, Kanté made 16 appearances. ASOA Valence saw the talent in the 21-year-old and signed him. He spent one season there and was the focal point of the team, anchoring the center of their defense. He left the club due to its financial insecurity, having made 32 appearances.

Strasbourg and Nice
He then returned to boyhood club Strasbourg, signing a three-year deal. He quickly made it into the first team and was a main part of their progression within Ligue 2. In Kanté's three seasons for the club, he scored 3 league goals in 91 appearances. At the end of his contract, he signed with Ligue 1 side Nice. His first season at the club was disappointing, with them barely escaping relegation. However his and the club had better fortunes helping them achieve an 8th-place finish in his second season. His last season was more of the same, as he helped Nice finish respectably in 9th place during the 2008–09 campaign. After three successful seasons, Kanté left the club for Super League Greece club Panathinaikos. In all, he made 97 Ligue 1 appearances for the side and added 2 goals.

Panathinaikos
Kanté signed a three-year deal with Panathinaikos in June 2009. In his first season at Panathinaikos, he helped the "Prasinoi", the Greens, to their first Greek Championship and Greek Cup in six years. In the Greek Cup Final, Kanté played a vital role in the center of the defense for Panathinaikos as they defeated Aris 1–0 with a goal from Argentinian winger Sebastián Leto.

In his first season at Panathinaikos, Kanté appeared in 21 league games and added 2 assists to his name.

Sochaux
In July 2012, Kanté returned to France, signing a two-year contract with Ligue 1 team FC Sochaux-Montbéliard.

Ajaccio
After suffering relegation to Ligue 2 with Sochaux in the 2013–14 season, Kanté left the club and signed a one-year contract with another relegated side, AC Ajaccio.

International career
Born in France, Kanté was eligible to play for the Mali national team through his ancestry. He opted to play for the country of his parents' birth and represented the Eagles 25 times as well as at the 2008 Africa Cup of Nations in Ghana.

Honours
Strasbourg
 Coupe de France: 2000–01
 Coupe de la Ligue: 2004–05

Panathinaikos
 Super League Greece: 2009–10
 Greek Cup: 2009–10

Mali
Africa Cup of Nations bronze: 2012

References

External links

1979 births
Living people
Footballers from Strasbourg
Association football defenders
French people of Malian descent
Malian footballers
French footballers
Mali international footballers
2008 Africa Cup of Nations players
2012 Africa Cup of Nations players
RC Strasbourg Alsace players
FC Istres players
ASOA Valence players
OGC Nice players
Panathinaikos F.C. players
FC Sochaux-Montbéliard players
AC Ajaccio players
Ligue 1 players
Ligue 2 players
Super League Greece players
Malian expatriate footballers
Expatriate footballers in France
Expatriate footballers in Greece
Black French sportspeople